Slaven "Slavko" Došlo (born 11 April 1991) is a Serbian actor. He is best known for his highly praised roles in Next to Me (2015) and Panama (2015).

Biography 
Došlo graduated from Belgrade's Faculty of Dramatic Arts. He starred in Serbia's biggest domestic film of 2015, Next to Me. His stand-out performance as a sharp-witted high school student who enjoys Serbian cinema's first teenage gay kiss attracted critical acclaim at home and abroad. He followed this up with a lead role in the film Panama.
	
He starred in Humidity, a captivating drama from Serbian director Nikola Ljuca, which won the Best Film Award at the Belgrade Film Festival FEST in February 2016. 	

In April 2016, Došlo signed on to play a new recruit in RTS TV series Vojna akademija. 	

As well as numerous local productions, Došlo has performed in musical theatre at Belgrade's renowned Terazije Theatre in productions of Zorba the Greek and Glavo luda, based on the songs of Zdravko Čolić.

Awards and recognition
For his performance in the Award-winning play by Filip Vujošević, Life Stands Still, Life Goes On at Belgrade's Bitef Theatre, in 2015, Slaven received the Dara Calenic Foundation Award for Best Young Actor.

In October 2015 Došlo was named Actor of the Year in the first ‘League of Extraordinary Gentlemen’ from Serbia's Men's Health magazine.

In November 2016, Došlo received his first international award for acting, in the form of an Angela Award from Ireland's Subtitle European Film Festival.

References

External links 
 

1991 births
Living people
People from Sombor
Serbian male film actors